Eoophyla pervenustalis is a moth in the family Crambidae. It was described by George Hampson in 1897. It is found in Angola, Cameroon, the Democratic Republic of the Congo, Ghana, Kenya, Nigeria, Sierra Leone and Uganda.

The wingspan is 18–26 mm. The forewings are white with a brown costa in the basal half and a fuscous antemedian fascia, a yellow median fascia. The base of the hindwings is white with a brown subbasal fascia. Adults have been recorded on wing nearly year round.

References

Eoophyla
Moths described in 1897
Moths of Africa